Ibrahim Idris Kpotun (born 15 January 1959) is a Nigerian police officer and former Inspector General of Police. He was appointed to this position by President Muhammadu Buhari on 21 March 2016, serving till his retirement in January 2019. He replaced Solomon Arase, who retired from the police force on 21 June 2016.

Prior to his appointment, he was an Assistant Inspector General of Police(Operations), FHQ Abuja. He also led the Police Mobile Force as well as the Kano State and Nasarawa State police commands in Nigeria while serving in the rank of Commissioner of Police.

Biography 
Idris hails from Kutigi, Lavun in Niger State. He was born on 15 January 1959, and enlisted into the Nigerian Police Force in 1984, after graduating from the Ahmadu Bello University Zaria with a bachelor's degree in Agriculture. He also holds a degree in Law from the University of Maiduguri.

Records achieved 
Idris is the first and only IGP in history of Nigeria to declared his assets publicly and received commendation from the Code of Conduct Bureau for complying with declaration of assets regulations and also the only IGP to have deploy female officer in commanding units at state level.

References

1959 births
Living people
Nigerian police chiefs
People from Niger State
People from Kano State
People from Nasarawa State
Ahmadu Bello University alumni
University of Maiduguri alumni